Tropical Cop Tales is an American comedy television series created by Jim Hosking and Toby Harvard for Adult Swim. The show revolves around two burned-out city cops, Keymarion "Primetime" Weeyums and Demetrius "Meechie" Franks, who have both relocated to an unnamed small tropical town for a relaxing end to their careers, but soon find out the town is not at all relaxing. The series is produced by Alive and Kicking, Inc.

A pilot for the series was ordered and scenes were previewed on the Adult Swim streaming series Development Meeting hosted by company vice presidents Walter Newman and Cameron Tang. On June 27, 2018, Adult Swim announced the series would have its regular premiere on July 29, 2018.

On May 24, 2020, Adult Swim canceled Tropical Cop Tales following the first season. The series was not picked up for a second season.

Cast
Dominique Witten as Primetime Weeyums
Ted Ferguson as Meechie Franks
Carl Solomon as Captain Solomon
Gil Gex as Dame Edith Ezold
Sky Elobar as Little Lord Piss The Pot
Grant Goodman as Angus Franks
Wayne Dehart as Old Mungo Weeyums
Stephen Hart as Young Mungo Weeyums
Troy Beecham as Andre The Chef
Brian Russell as Cocky Rico
Jennifer Van Horn as Governor Mary Gold
Holland MacFallister as Animale
Bob McHone as Big Danny
Charles Noland as Don Quidong
Mike Benitez as Ronald the Ringman
Michael St Michaels as Seedy Dave
Sam Dissanayake as King Skull
Jerry Ascione as Nattanyell
 William Tokarsky as Man with Gold boots

Episodes

Pilot (2018)

Season 1 (2019)

References

Notes

Citations

External links
 

2018 American television series debuts
2019 American television series endings
2010s American black comedy television series
Adult Swim original programming
English-language television shows
Television series by Williams Street